The San Joaquin Valley  is the area of the Central Valley of California that lies south of the Sacramento–San Joaquin River Delta in Stockton.

This is a list of museums, defined for this context as institutions (including nonprofit organizations, government entities, and private businesses) that collect and care for objects of cultural, artistic, scientific, or historical interest and make their collections or related exhibits available for public viewing. Also included are non-profit and university art galleries. Museums that exist only in cyberspace (i.e., virtual museums) are not included.

To use the sortable tables: click on the icons at the top of each column to sort that column in alphabetical order; click again for reverse alphabetical order.

Museums

Defunct museums
 Castle Science and Technology Center, Atwater, closed in 2012
 Clark Center for Japanese Art and Culture, Hanford, website, closed in 2015, collections moved to the Minneapolis Institute of Arts and the bonsai collection to the Shinzen Friendship Garden in Woodward Park, Fresno
 Fresno Metropolitan Museum of Art and Science, Fresno, closed in 2010

See also
National Register of Historic Places listings in Fresno County, California
National Register of Historic Places listings in Kern County, California
National Register of Historic Places listings in Kings County, California
National Register of Historic Places listings in Madera County, California
National Register of Historic Places listings in Merced County, California
National Register of Historic Places listings in San Joaquin County, California
National Register of Historic Places listings in Stanislaus County, California
National Register of Historic Places listings in Tulare County, California

References

External links
 California State Association of Counties (CSAC)

San Joaquin
M01